Various organisations in Nazi Germany required their members to swear oaths to Adolf Hitler by name, rather than to the German state or an officeholder. Such oaths were intended to increase personal loyalty to Hitler and prevent dissent. The Hitler oath, introduced for all members of the Wehrmacht and civil servants in 1934, was one such oath. Others were sworn by members of organisations such as the Schutzstaffel (SS), whose oath may have inspired the Hitler oath, and by the Hitler Youth.

Background 
The most famous of the oaths to Hitler was the Hitler Oath introduced to the Wehrmacht (armed forces) and civil service by Adolf Hitler in August 1934. Those swearing the oath promised their loyalty to Hitler in person, rather than the state or its offices, and it was intended to increase loyalty to Hitler and to prevent dissidence.  Other oaths, with similar aims, were sworn by other organisations. The oath sworn to Hitler by members of the Schutzstaffel (SS) predated that of the 1934 Wehrmacht oath and may have served as an inspiration or model for it.

SS oath 
Members of the Schutzstaffel (SS), founded by the Nazi Party in 1925, swore the following oath:

The oath was renewed publicly at an annual ceremony.  After 30 January 1941 foreign-born members of the SS swore to Hitler only as Führer, not as "Führer and Chancellor"; Volksdeutsche members of the SS continued to swear the original oath.  SS Gruppenführers swore a supplementary oath to adhere to Heinrich Himmler's specifications for recruits even if "it means rejecting my own children or the children of my clan ... I swear by Adolf Hitler and by the honour of my ancestors — so help me god".

Wehrmacht and civil service oath 

After gaining power and appointing himself head of state Hitler altered the traditional oath sworn by Wehrmacht servicemen to the state or supreme commander. The new wording of the oath, which came to be known as the Hitler oath, was to Hitler personally and was ordered to be taken by all members of the Wehrmacht.  The oath was a change to that of the previous oaths which swore loyalty to the state, and not any individual, and had been sworn only by new recruits.  There are some similarities between the oath and those sworn to the monarch in British and Commonwealth armies but the Nazi oath was granted more ceremony and German soldiers placed more significance upon a strict adherence to it.

The oath functioned as intended, forming a moral obstacle for any considering disobeying Hitler's orders or offering resistance to his regime.  Former German officers used the oath as evidence in war crime trials after the war as part of their superior orders defence.

Hitler Youth 
Members of the Hitler Youth swore the following oath:

The oath was sworn by those entering the organisation in a ceremony held before the "blood banner" (Blutfahne), said to have been soaked in the blood of those who died in the Munich Beer Hall Putsch of 1923.  The swearing of the oath has been described by German historian and former Hitler Youth member Hermann Graml as part of the "cult-like" nature of the organisation key to attracting recruits.

Foreign volunteers 

Like the German armed forces and civil servants, foreign volunteers and conscripts from Nazi puppet states, and occupied countries, were required to swear an oath of personal loyalty and obedience to Adolf Hitler. In some cases, foreign units were allowed to retain some scraps of national identity to make it seem that they had volunteered to join Hitler's war, not as collaborators, but as loyal patriots defending their country against Bolshevism; this was an argument many accused collaborators tried to use after the war.

The requirement could be a source of political friction in contingents which had been promised a high degree of national autonomy. Significant unrest took place among Flemish volunteers in the SS Assault Brigade Langemarck, for example, which was required to swear an oath of allegiance in November 1943. As a result, 200 recalcitrant soldiers were removed or transferred to penal military units.

Oath of the Croatian volunteers of the Waffen-SS

Oath of the Latvian Legion

Oath of the Greek Security Battalions

See also 
Oath of allegiance

References 

Symbols of Nazi Germany
Oaths of allegiance
Military oaths
Adolf Hitler